The East Melbourne Cricket Ground was a grass oval sports venue located at the corner of Wellington Parade and Jolimont Parade, in East Melbourne, Victoria, Australia. Now part of Yarra Park and being adjacent to the Melbourne Cricket Ground, the site is best known for playing host to many sporting events during the city of Melbourne's early existence, consisting mainly of cricket and Australian rules football, although the ground occasionally hosted soccer matches.

History
The ground was opened in 1860 and closed in 1921. It adjoined the Melbourne Cricket Ground and was not  far from the Richmond Cricket Ground, all three grounds being sited in the area formerly known as Captain Lonsdale's Cow Paddock, now Yarra Park.

Cricket
East Melbourne Cricket Club was the most successful member of the Victorian Cricket Association (VCA) during the 19th Century and early 20th Century, winning more than half of the VCA's Premierships during that period. The club was formed in 1857 as the Abbotsford Cricket Club but they soon changed their name as part of a putsch to use the East Melbourne ground. The team mainly consisted of Scotch College old boys.

Four first-class cricket games were played at the ground in the 1880s, including the Smokers v Non-Smokers match, in which the Non-Smokers made 803, at the time a world record innings score.

Australian rules football

The oval was used for Australian rules football games during the winter months from 1878. The ground also hosted the first-ever interstate representative football  match, on 1 July 1879, between Victoria - represented by the Victorian Football Association (VFA) - and South Australia. The match was attended by more than 10,000 people. It also hosted the first intercollegiate football match in Melbourne, played on 21 July 1881 between teams from the University of Melbourne colleges Trinity and Ormond.

Tenant football clubs of the ground included:
 East Melbourne Football Club, which used the ground until it disbanded in mid-1882.
 North Melbourne Football Club used the ground during the 1897 VFA season due to upgrading works on its usual home ground, the Arden Street Oval. The club also played an 1887 Queen's Birthday match at the ground, and another game there in 1891 as Arden Street was flooded. 
 West Melbourne Football Club moved to the ground for the 1907 VFA season, and disbanded the following year.
 Melbourne University Football Club played there from 1908 to 1910 in the VFL; the club left the ground before the 1911 season following a dispute with Essendon over rent.
  Melbourne City Football Club used it during its two years in the VFA, 1912 and 1913; Melbourne City lost all 36 matches it played in those two seasons.

The ground hosted 426 senior matches in the recognized top level of Victorian football - 201 matches in the VFA and 225 matches in the VFL/AFL - in 44 seasons of competition.

It also held 30 VFA finals between 1903 and 1921. The VFL held one final in the 1897 and 1901 finals series and the 1900 Grand Final at the ground, while the VFA also held the 1896 premiership play-off match at the ground.

As a venue for football, the East Melbourne Cricket Ground had an unusual quirk that the field sloped downhill towards the railway end, but was often affected by a strong wind which blew to the pavilion end.

The record football crowd at the venue was 36,185 for a VFA match between Essendon and South Melbourne in 1891, the record attendance for a match at that time.

The VFL record was 20,181 for the 1900 Grand Final, with the record for a VFL home and away match being 18,000, set twice in 1921.

Soccer
Occasionally, soccer was played at the oval. The best known use for the sport were the interstate representative matches between the colonies of Victoria and New South Wales in the 1880s. Four matches were played between 1883 and 1887 with three taking place at the East Melbourne Cricket Ground with the other being played at the South Melbourne Cricket Ground that ended in a nil-all draw.

Lacrosse
The ground was occasionally used as a venue for lacrosse, and hosted Victoria's first intercolonial lacrosse match on 1 September 1888, against South Australia (the first intercolonial match in Australia was played between Queensland and New South Wales a year earlier). The match was not largely attended, due in part to the cold and showery weather on the day, with Victoria winning the match by 5 goals to 1.

Closure
After the 1921 football season, the ground was closed and then demolished to make way for an extension of the Jolimont Yard railway sidings.

The East Melbourne Cricket Club subsequently amalgamated with the Hawthorn Cricket Club to form the Hawthorn-East Melbourne Cricket Club, and moved to Hawthorn's Glenferrie Oval. One of the wooden stands was moved from East Melbourne to Glenferrie Oval, where it stood until 1965, when it was replaced by the Dr A.S. Ferguson Stand.

After the Essendon Football Club lost the use of the ground, it moved to the Essendon Recreation Reserve. It had initially tried to move to the North Melbourne Recreation Reserve, resulting in a major off-field political struggle between the Essendon Association and  Football Clubs, the VFL and the VFA.

The former site of the ground has now been taken over by a housing estate, a feature of which is a semi-circular housing block with a tower obviously designed to look like an ersatz football pavilion. The oval is now a park.

See also
 History of Australian rules football in Victoria (1853–1900)

References

Sports venues in Melbourne
Defunct Australian Football League grounds
Defunct cricket grounds in Australia
Defunct soccer venues in Australia
Cricket grounds in Victoria (Australia)
Sports venues completed in 1860
Sports venues demolished in 1922
1860 establishments in Australia
1922 disestablishments in Australia
East Melbourne, Victoria